Wilson Cottage is a historic cure cottage located at Saranac Lake, Franklin County, New York. It was built about 1910 and is a -story, three-by-five-bay rectangular frame dwelling in the Queen Anne style. It features a partially enclosed wraparound porch on the front facade topped by an inset second story cure porch.

It was listed on the National Register of Historic Places in 1992.

References

Houses on the National Register of Historic Places in New York (state)
Queen Anne architecture in New York (state)
Houses completed in 1915
Houses in Franklin County, New York
National Register of Historic Places in Franklin County, New York